The prime minister of Spain is the head of government of Spain. There is no specific date as to when the office of Prime Minister first appeared as the role was not created, but rather evolved over a period of time through a merger of duties. Modern historians have not managed to agree who the first prime minister of Spain was, but Francisco Martínez de la Rosa was the first prime minister recognized by a constitutional law (the Spanish Royal Statute of 1834).

In contemporary Spain, the first Prime Minister of the Kingdom of Spain since the approval of the Constitution was Adolfo Suárez. Due to the gradual evolution of the post, the title has been applied to early prime ministers retroactively. The following list therefore includes those who have been referred to as various other titles since the creation of the Council of Ministers in 1823. Since the reign of Philip V, prime ministers have received several names, such as Secretary of State (until 1834), President of the Council of Ministers (1834–1868; 1874–1923; 1925–1936), President of the Executive Power (1874) or President of the Government (1938–present), among others.

Office title
First Secretary of State (1823–1834)
President of the Council of Ministers (1834–1868; 1869–1873; 1874–1923; 1925–1931; 1931–1939)
President of the Provisional Government and of the Council of Ministers (1868–1869)
President of the Executive Power (1869; 1873–1874)
Head of the Government and President of the Military Directory (1923–1925)
President of the Provisional Government (1931)
President of the National Defence Council (1939)
President of the Government (1939–present)

List of officeholders

Kingdom of Spain (1823–1868)
Governments:

Democratic Sexennium and First Republic (1868–1874)
Governments:

Bourbon Restoration in Spain (1874–1931)
Governments:

Second Spanish Republic (1931–1939)
Governments:

Francoist Spain (1936–1975)
Governments:

Kingdom of Spain (1975–present)
Governments:

Timeline

Notes

References

See also
 Prime Minister of Spain
 List of prime ministers of Spain by length of tenure
 List of Spanish monarchs
 List of heads of state of Spain
 President of the Republic (Spain)
 List of Spanish regents

Government of Spain
Politics of Spain
Prime Ministers
Spain
Lists of political office-holders in Spain